Taylor Smith (born 13 February 2000) is an Australian rules footballer playing for the Brisbane Lions in the AFL Women's competition (AFLW). She is a premiership player with the Lions, having played in the club's 2021 AFL Women's Grand Final side. 

Smith previously played for Gold Coast.

Early life
Smith grew up on the Gold Coast and attended Coomera Anglican College throughout her upbringing. Her first sporting interest came at the age of 10 in the form of athletics where she predominantly focused on high jump and hurdles. She transitioned to heptathlon at the age of 16 and began competing at the national level in just her fourth ever event in the sport. Towards the end of Year 12, she played Australian rules football for the first time in the local APS inter-school competition and was spotted by an AFL Queensland scout who organised a trial with the Gold Coast Suns academy. She began playing club football for the first time in 2018 for Bond University in the QAFLW.

Less than two years after playing football for the first time, Smith was announced as a priority signing for the Gold Coast Suns' inaugural AFLW list.

AFLW career

Gold Coast
Smith made her AFLW debut for Gold Coast in round 6 of the 2020 AFL Women's season.

Brisbane
In August 2020, Smith was traded to Brisbane, along with a couple of picks, for the 24th pick of the 2020 AFL Women's draft.

Smith had a strong first season with the Lions in which she played every game. Smith became a premiership player in the club's 2021 AFL Women's Grand Final winning side.

Statistics
Statistics are correct to the end of the 2021 season.

|- style=background:#EAEAEA
| scope=row | 2020 ||  || 13
| 1 || 0 || 0 || 3 || 7 || 10 || 1 || 1 || 4 || 0.0 || 0.0 || 3.0 || 7.0 || 10.0 || 1.0 || 1.0 || 4.0 || 0
|-
| scope=row bgcolor=F0E68C | 2021# ||  || 31
| 11 || 5 || 5 || 37 || 18 || 55 || 17 || 18 || 57 || 0.5 || 0.5 || 3.4 || 1.6 || 5.0 || 1.5 || 1.6 || 5.2 || 2
|- class=sortbottom
! colspan=3 | Career
! 12 !! 5 !! 5 !! 40 !! 25 !! 65 !! 18 !! 19 !! 61 !! 0.4 !! 0.4 !! 3.3 !! 2.1 !! 5.4 !! 1.5 !! 1.6 !! 5.1 !! 2
|}

References

External links 

2000 births
Living people
Sportspeople from the Gold Coast, Queensland
Sportswomen from Queensland
Australian rules footballers from Queensland
Gold Coast Football Club (AFLW) players
Brisbane Lions (AFLW) players